Antonio Graves Davis (born April 17, 1985) is an American professional basketball player for Ormanspor Genclik Ankara of the Turkish Basketball First League.

Career

After completing college with University of Pittsburgh, he played for Pittsburgh Xplosion of the (Continental Basketball Association) during 2007–08 season.

He signed for Élan Béarnais Pau-Orthez (Pro A) in December 2007.

After participating to the U.S. summer-league during summer 2008, he signed with Galatasaray Café Crown (Turkish Basketball League).

In August 2013, he signed with Artland Dragons of the German Basketball League. In August 2014, he re-signed with Dragons for one more season.

On February 26, 2016, Graves signed with Crailsheim Merlins for the rest of the 2015–16 season.

On September 6, 2016, Graves signed a deal until mid-January 2017, with Skyliners Frankfurt. Following the expiration of his contract, on January 13, 2017, he parted ways with Skyliners after averaging 7.7 points per game.

The Basketball Tournament (TBT)
In the summer of 2017, Graves competed in The Basketball Tournament on ESPN for the number one seeded FCM Untouchables. Competing for the $2 million grand prize, Graves  averaged 4.3 points, 1.3 rebounds, 1.3 assists and 1.0 steals per game. The Untouchables advanced to the Super 16 Round where they were defeated 85–71 by Team FOE, a Philadelphia based team coached by NBA forwards Markieff and Marcus Morris.  Graves also played for the Untouchables during the summer of 2016.  Over the span of four games, he averaged 6.5 points, 1.8 rebounds and 1.3 assists while shooting 43% from the three-point line.

References

External links
Antonio Graves at eurobasket.com
Antonio Graves at fiba.com
Antonio Graves at tblstat.net
Antonio Graves at realgm.com

1985 births
Living people
American expatriate basketball people in Belarus
American expatriate basketball people in Croatia
American expatriate basketball people in France
American expatriate basketball people in Germany
American expatriate basketball people in Israel
American expatriate basketball people in Italy
American expatriate basketball people in Turkey
Artland Dragons players
Bandırma B.İ.K. players
Basketball players from Ohio
BC Tsmoki-Minsk players
Canton Charge players
Crailsheim Merlins players
Élan Béarnais players
Galatasaray S.K. (men's basketball) players
Hapoel Holon players
Israeli Basketball Premier League players
KK Cibona players
Pistoia Basket 2000 players
Pittsburgh Panthers men's basketball players
Skyliners Frankfurt players
American men's basketball players
Shooting guards
Sportspeople from Mansfield, Ohio